Elections to Dorset County Council took place on 4 June 2009. The vote was delayed from 7 May, in order to coincide with elections to the European Parliament. A key issue in the election was an Audit Commission report on social care which reported a decline in standards since 2006, however the Conservative party responded that their administration was the best performing county council in England. There were fears however that voter turnout would be a record low.

Election result summary

|}

Election result by division

References

External links
Election Nominations - full list of nominated candidates, at Dorset County website

2009 English local elections
2009
2000s in Dorset